Direcția Generală de Informații a Apărării (General Directorate for Defense Intelligence, DGIA) is Romanian Armed Forces's military intelligence agency, underneath the Ministry of National Defense.

DGIA is organized into two directorates:
 Direcția Informații Militare (Directorate for Military Intelligence - foreign intelligence)
 Direcţia Siguranță Militară (Directorate for Military Security - counter-intelligence).

See also
 Romanian Armed Forces

References 

Military intelligence agencies
Romanian intelligence agencies
Ministry of National Defence (Romania)